The pygmy spiny-tailed skink (Egernia depressa) is a species of skink, a lizard in the family Scincidae.

The species is endemic to Australia and is found in the states Western Australia, the Northern Territory and South Australia.

References

Skinks of Australia
Egernia
Endemic fauna of Australia
Taxa named by Albert Günther
Reptiles described in 1875